Patrick Bailey (born January 18, 1956) is an American college baseball coach and former outfielder. He played college baseball at North Idaho College from 1975 to 1976, before transferring to Idaho where he played for coach John G. Smith from 1977 to 1978. He then served as the head coach of the George Fox Bruins (1996–2007) and the Oregon State Beavers (2019).

Playing career
A three-sport athlete at Moscow High School, Bailey attended the University of Idaho where he played baseball.

Coaching career
On September 6, 2018, Pat Casey announced his retirement from Oregon State, and Bailey was named the interim head coach. Bailey was replaced by Mitch Canham after going 36–20–1 in his interim season, but Bailey remained with the team as an assistant coach for the 2020 season. On July 31, 2020, it was announced that Bailey would not be returning to the Beavers' coaching staff in 2021.

Head coaching record

References

External links
Oregon State Bio

1956 births
Living people
Baseball outfielders
Junior college baseball players in the United States
Idaho Vandals baseball players
Oregon State Beavers baseball coaches
Portland Pilots baseball coaches
George Fox Bruins baseball coaches
High school baseball coaches in the United States
People from Moscow, Idaho